A by-election was held for the New South Wales Legislative Assembly electorate of Wollondilly on 26 October 1957. The election was triggered by the resignation of Blake Pelly.

Dates

Candidates
Tom Lewis was a lieutenant in the Australian Imperial Force and then the manager of a chicken farm at Castlereagh.
Ern Seager  was the Labor candidate at the 1956 and 1959 elections. He was unsuccessful on each occasion.
Murrum Sweet was a former president of Wollondilly Shire. This was the only occasion in which he stood for election in New South Wales.

Result

Blake Pelly resigned.

See also
Electoral results for the district of Wollondilly
List of New South Wales state by-elections

References 

1957 elections in Australia
New South Wales state by-elections
1950s in New South Wales